Stuart Patrick Jude Zender (born 18 March 1974) is an English bassist. He is best known as a former member of the band Jamiroquai.

Biography

Early life 
Zender was born in Sheffield, England. He comes from a family with a musical background: Zender's father was a musician, his uncle was a flamenco guitarist, and his older sister participated in punk bands. His family relocated to Norristown, Pennsylvania, when Zender was seven years old. He moved back to England at age 15, where he attended Leighton Park School in Reading, UK, for a year in 1988–89 before being expelled. Before leaving his home at age seventeen, Zender's mother had saved for him £2,000 for the occasion.

As Zender said, he never had good business acumen, so instead of investing that money in some way, he visited a music store and bought a Warwick Streamer bass guitar which cost nearly the whole amount given to him by his mother. Before picking up a Warwick, Zender played a Music Man Stingray bass guitar. Of his early bands, the most famous was the prank rock group Fabulous, a 1991 outfit chiefly made up of NME writers and photographers.  He also said that in another interview, he played a drum with a circus group without animals at that time.

Jamiroquai (1993–1998) 
When Zender got out of school, he auditioned for Jamiroquai in 1993 as the band's bassist, and he played on studio albums from Emergency on Planet Earth (1993) to Travelling Without Moving (1996). From there, Zender was asked to become an official Warwick basses endorser. He received a number of unique customised Streamer models.

Zender left Jamiroquai in 1998 during the recording of their fourth album, Synkronized, primarily because of conflicts with the band leader Jay Kay. A spokesperson for the band said that Zender also expressed his desire to spend more time with his new wife Melanie Blatt, a member of UK girl group All Saints, and their new baby Lilyella.

1998–present
After Jamiroquai, Zender had his own project with the British soul artist Don-E called AZUR, which signed a record deal with d'Angelo's label. However, the project was shelved and was then available on the Internet for a short time. He has also played bass guitar with other artists, including All Saints, Omar, Lauryn Hill, D'Angelo, Gorillaz, Samuel Purdey, Ms. Dynamite and Stevie Wonder. Zender and Melanie Blatt were together romantically for seven years. They have one daughter, named Lilyella. Some of Zender's most recent work was with the band Leroi. Zender explained they were signed to Geffen Records in Los Angeles but that the deal fell through after the heads of the company, Polly Anthony and Jordan Shurr, who signed them, were made redundant.

Zender left Los Angeles in summer 2006 to become the musical director and bass guitar player for Mark Ronson. The release of the album Version in 2007 proved to be a larger success than first expected. He has played bass guitar for Ronson at events such as BBC Radio 1's Big Weekend, Wireless Festival, Global Gathering, and Glastonbury, and festivals all over Europe, including Montreux Jazz Festival in Switzerland and North Sea Jazz Festival in Rotterdam. They were also special guests on Jay-Z's UK tour.

Having left the Mark Ronson band in 2011, Zender started his own record label, White Buffalo Recordings, and formerly ran the music publishing company Made Youth Inc.

Equipment

 1x Warwick SZ Signature Bass 4-string.
 1x Warwick SZ Signature Bass 4-string (Red one, saw live in Paris and Amsterdam for Mark Ronson).
 1x Warwick SZ Signature Bass 4-string (White one, Zender posted the picture on Facebook).
 1x Warwick "Iroquai Rug Bass" Streamer 5-string.
 1x Warwick "The Chrome Ender Bass" Streamer Stage I 4-string.
 1x Fender 1964 Precision Bass.
 1x Warwick Streamer Stage II 5-string (used in 1995 live).
 1x Alembic Epic 4-string (onstage backup bass guitar).
 1x Warwick Streamer Stage I 4-string.
 Ashdown Engineering ABM Amplification.
 Ashdown Engineering SZ Funk Face Twin Dynamic Filter Pedal – Stuart Zender Signature Auto-Wah Pedal

Album appearances
Jamiroquai – Emergency on Planet Earth (bass guitar)
Jamiroquai – The Return of the Space Cowboy (bass guitar, writer)
Guru – Jazzmatazz, Vol. 2: The New Reality (bass guitar)
Jamiroquai – Travelling Without Moving (bass guitar, writer)
 Adele – 19 (bass guitar on "Cold Shoulder")
Live from 6A – Late Night with Conan O'Brien
Lauryn Hill – The Miseducation of Lauryn HillMica Paris – Black Angel (bass guitar)
 Mattafix – Signs of a Struggle (bass guitar, keyboards)
Omar – Best by Far (bass guitar, percussion, electric guitar, keyboards, programming, co-writer, producer)
All Saints – Saints and Sinners (writer, producer, mixer, keyboards, bass guitar, percussion, strings, programming)
Spacemonkeyz vs. Gorillaz – Laika Come HomeMark Ronson – Version (bass guitar)
Mark Ronson & The Business Intl. – Record Collection (bass guitar on "Somebody To Love Me")
Incognito – In Search of Better Days (2016)'' (bass guitar)

References

External links
 Stuart Zender official website
 Stuart Zender on Myspace
 Interview with Stuart Zender on Warwick Forum
 An Interview With Bassist Stuart Zender, 10/01/2009
 

English bass guitarists
English male guitarists
Male bass guitarists
English people of Dutch descent
English people of German descent
1974 births
Living people
People educated at Leighton Park School
Jamiroquai members
Grammy Award winners
21st-century bass guitarists